PLATO (Package for Linear-combination of ATomic Orbitals) is a suite of programs for electronic structure calculations. It receives its name from the choice of basis set (numeric atomic orbitals) used to expand the electronic wavefunctions.

PLATO is a code, written in C, for the efficient modelling of materials. It is a tight binding code (both orthogonal and non-orthogonal), allowing for multipole charges and electron spin. It also contains Density Functional Theory programs: these were restored to enable clear benchmarking to tight binding simulations, but can be used in their own right. The Density Functional Tight Binding program can be applied to systems with periodic boundary conditions in three dimension (crystals), as well as clusters and molecules.

How PLATO works 
How PLATO performs Density Functional Theory is summarized in several papers:

. The way it performs tight binding is summarized in the following papers

Applications of PLATO 
Some examples of its use are listed below.

Metals 
 Point defects in transition metals: Density functional theory calculations have been performed to study the systematic trends of point defect behaviours in bee transition metals.

Surfaces 
 Interaction of C60 molecules on Si(100):The interactions between pairs of C60 molecules adsorbed upon the Si(100) surface have been studied via a series of DFT calculations.

Molecules 
 Efficient local-orbitals based method for ultrafast dynamics: The evolution of electrons in molecules under the influence of time-dependent electric fields is simulated.

See also 
 List of quantum chemistry and solid state physics software

References

External links 
 Computer Physics Communications Program Library, from which Plato can be downloaded

Computational chemistry software